Ira is an unincorporated community located in Independence Township, Jasper County, Iowa, United States.  The population in 2010 was 29 people.

History
Ira was platted in 1883. It was originally called Millard. Ira's population was 20 in 1887, and was 79 in 1902.

Education
Colfax–Mingo Community School District operates area public schools. The Colfax and Mingo school districts consolidated on July 1, 1985.

References

Unincorporated communities in Jasper County, Iowa
Unincorporated communities in Iowa
1883 establishments in Iowa